Ratio is a peer-reviewed academic journal of analytic philosophy, edited by David S. Oderberg (Reading University) and published by Wiley-Blackwell. Ratio is published quarterly and in December publishes a special issue that is focused specifically on one area, calling on specialists in that field of study to contribute.

It is a successor to a previous journal, also called Ratio and published in parallel editions in German and English. It was sponsored by the  Society  for  the  Furtherance  of  the Critical Philosophy and the Philosophisch-politische  Akademie which ran from 1957 until December 1987 with 29 volumes.

References

External links
 

Philosophy journals
Wiley-Blackwell academic journals
Quarterly journals
English-language journals
Analytic philosophy literature